Pedro Sanchez (born 1940) is the director of the Agriculture & Food Security Center, senior research scholar, and director of the Millennium Villages Project at the Earth Institute at Columbia University. 
Sanchez was director general of the World Agroforestry Centre (ICRAF) headquartered in Nairobi, Kenya from 1991-2001, and served as co-chair of the UN Millennium Project Hunger Task Force. 
He is also professor emeritus of soil science and forestry at North Carolina State University, and was a visiting professor at the University of California, Berkeley.

Life
A native of Cuba, Sanchez received his BS, MS and PhD degrees in soil science from Cornell University, and joined the faculty of North Carolina State University in 1968. His professional career has been dedicated to help eliminate world hunger and absolute rural poverty while protecting and enhancing the tropical environment. 
Sanchez has lived in the Philippines (working at the International Rice Research Institute), Peru (working at the Peruvian National Research Institute), Colombia (working at the International Center for Tropical Agriculture) and Kenya. He is the author of "Properties and Management of Soils of the Tropics" (rated among the top 10 best-selling books in soil science worldwide), co-author of "Halving Hunger: It can be done" and author of over 250 scientific publications.

He is a Fellow of the American Society of Agronomy, the Soil Science Society of America, the American Association for the Advancement of Science, and has received the International Soil Science Award, the International Service in Agronomy Award, the Crop Science Society of America Presidential Award in 2003, and the Soil Science Society of America Presidential Award in 2012. He serves on the Board of Agriculture and Natural Resources of the National Academy of Sciences and the Board of Directors of Millennium Promise.

Sanchez has received honorary Doctor of Science degrees from the Catholic University of Leuven, Belgium, the University of Guelph, Canada and The Ohio State University, USA.  He has received decorations from the governments of Colombia and Peru, and was anointed Luo Elder with the name of Odera Akang'o by the Luo community of Western Kenya. Sanchez is the 2002 World Food Prize laureate and a 2003 MacArthur Fellow. He received the Charles A. Black Award from the Council for Agricultural Science and Technology, (presented to a food or agricultural scientist actively engaged in research, who has made significant scientific contributions to science) and was elected as a fellow of the American Academy of Arts & Sciences in 2008. 

In 2011, Sanchez and his wife, Cheryl Palm, set up the Sanchez-Palm Girls Scholarship Fund for secondary-school-aged girls in poor, rural parts of Africa. The fund will support the ability of African girls to attend secondary schools (high schools) and also improve those schools with computers and internet availability. Said Sanchez, "Cheryl and I are proud to play a part in advancing girls education, because we know an educated girl can have a profound impact on the development of a community."

Sanchez was elected to the US National Academy of Sciences in 2012. He is currently a Research Professor of Tropical Soils at the University of Florida Soil & Water Sciences Department and core faculty of the Institute for Sustainable Food Systems.

References

Further reading
McMurray, Emmily J., ed. Notable 20th Century Scientists. Detroit, MI: Gale Research Inc. 1995
"Pedro A. Sanchez '62: My Cornell Story"  May 2012 - PeriodiCALS, The Magazine of Cornell University's College of Agriculture and Life Sciences

External links
Tropical Agriculture Program at The Earth Institute at Columbia University
Career summary
Halving Hunger: It Can Be Done
Earth Institute Bio

1940 births
American soil scientists
Cuban emigrants to the United States
Living people
MacArthur Fellows
Fellows of the American Academy of Arts and Sciences
Members of the United States National Academy of Sciences
Cornell University College of Agriculture and Life Sciences alumni
Columbia University faculty
Agriculture and food award winners

North Carolina State University faculty